The Iran Unity Party was a socialist political party in Iran. It split the Iran Party following its alliance with the communist Tudeh Party of Iran in 1946.

According to Leonard Binder, the party was in a coalition with the National Union Party and Socialist Party in the 14th parliament.

References

1946 establishments in Iran
Centrist parties in Iran
Defunct socialist parties in Iran
Political parties established in 1946
Political parties with year of disestablishment missing